Surjit Bhalla is an Indian economist, author and columnist, who is currently the Executive Director for India at the International Monetary Fund (IMF). He was appointed as a member of the newly formed Economic Advisory Council to the second Modi ministry, from where he resigned in December 2018.

Bhalla obtained his B.S. degree in Electrical Engineering from Purdue University in 1969 and worked for a year at Fairchild Semiconductor as a programming analyst. In 1970, he joined he Woodrow Wilson School, Princeton University and received a Master of Public Administration degree in 1972. Bhalla went on to enroll for a doctoral studies and received a PhD in Economics from Princeton University in 1976, having volunteered for a couple of years at Brookings Institution for the last couple of years. He also engaged in post-doctoral research for about a year, at RAND Corporation. Between 1978 and 1992, he worked at World Bank for multiple spans, as Chief Investment Officer and Senior Economist. From 1992 to 1994, he served as the Vice President of Goldman Sachs, before being hired as the Director of Deutsche Bank, where he continued till 1996.

He has authored several books, owns a portfolio management service and has been member of two committees set up by the Reserve Bank of India on capital account convertibility. Bhalla has been also on the governing board of National Council of Applied Economic Research, since 1999.

References

External links 
 Official website

Year of birth missing (living people)
Living people
Indian economists
Princeton University alumni
Purdue University College of Engineering alumni
Princeton School of Public and International Affairs alumni
21st-century Indian economists
20th-century Indian economists